The Volunteer Reserves are the British Armed Forces voluntary and part-time military reserve force. Unlike the Regular Reserve, the Volunteer Reserves do not consist of ex-Regular personnel who remain liable to be re-called for military service. Instead, the Volunteer Reserves consists of civilian volunteers who routinely undergo training and military operations alongside the Regular military. The Volunteer Reserves serve under a fixed-term reserve contract and provide "highly trained" military personnel integrated with their Regular counterparts, on operations both at home and overseas. For example, almost every major military operation has seen the deployment of Army Reservists alongside the Regular British Army. Volunteer Reserves are allowed to use the post-nominal letters VR after 10 years of service.

The Volunteer Reserves also includes the armed forces University Service Units (incl. below). These training units are not liable for military service, rather, they provide engagement and military training for undergraduate students at UK universities.

Volunteer Reserve units

The Volunteer Reserves primarily consist of four elements, each being an integrated part of their parent service and liable for military operations. University Service Units are listed with their parent organization:
Army Reserve – (incl. Officers' Training Corps)
Maritime Reserve
Royal Naval Reserve – (incl. University Royal Naval Units)
Royal Marines Reserve
RAF Reserve
Royal Auxiliary Air Force
Royal Air Force Volunteer Reserve – (incl. University Air Squadron)

Future Reserves 2020
As part of the "Future Reserves 2020" review conducted in 2012, the Volunteer Reserves (excl. University Service Units) will be fully integrated with the Regular Armed Forces and better prepared for overseas deployments and operations.

See also
Regular Reserve
Reserve Forces and Cadets Association
Maritime Reserve - a term used for the grouping together of the Royal Naval and Royal Marines Reserve
Reserve Forces Act 1996
Sponsored Reserves

Notes

References

External links
gov.uk MoD – reserves and cadet strengths, April 2014

Reserve forces of the United Kingdom